Water for Your Soul is the seventh studio album by English singer and songwriter Joss Stone, released on 31 July 2015 through her own label, Stone'd Records. It marks her first studio album of original material since LP1 (2011), following the release of the covers album The Soul Sessions Vol. 2 (2012). Musically, it incorporates reggae and hip hop with influences from many different genres, including soul, R&B, world, gospel, Latin and some Indian and Irish influence. The art design was made by Irish designer Aoife Hastings, who won a competition launched by Stone through social media which gave to fans the opportunity to draw her new album cover art.

Background
In 2008, Stone launched a legal battle in a bid to leave her record label, EMI, and free her of her current three-album deal with the record label. After EMI delayed the release of Colour Me Free!, originally scheduled for April 2009, the album was ultimately released on 20 October 2009. Stone said that her record company also fought her about the original cover of her new album, calling it "offensive", but by late August 2010, it was reported that Stone had parted ways with EMI. In January 2011, she launched her own independent record label, Stone'd Records.

Stone partnered with Surfdog Records to release her fifth studio album, LP1, on 26 July 2011, through her own label Stone'd Records. Stone also joined the supergroup SuperHeavy which was formed by Mick Jagger of the Rolling Stones, together with Dave Stewart, Damian Marley (the youngest son of Bob Marley) and Indian musician and producer A. R. Rahman. The group's self-titled debut album was released on 20 September 2011 by A&M Records. Additionally, Stone released her sixth studio album, The Soul Sessions Vol. 2, which saw Stone return to her original label, S-Curve Records, who released the album jointly with the singer's Stone'd Records.

Recording
Stone decided to record a reggae album after working with Damian Marley on SuperHeavy in 2011. In an interview with the Official Charts Company, she stated: "Damien actually said to me, 'Joss, you have to do a reggae album!' I'm not crazy enough to know that a reggae album from me would be a very weird thing to do, but the songs we've created are heavily rooted in that sound. That's the style of the album. There's also the Irish fiddles, the Sarod, the tablas, the gospel, flamenco guitar..."

Stone began to work on a new record as soon after launch her sixth album The Soul Sessions Vol. 2. She revealed to the newspaper La Vanguardia in July 2012 that she would work on a reggae album. She stated that it would be recorded and produced by herself and Marley. In March 2014, she elaborated that the new album would be a little bit different and "more eclectic" with a "little bit more hip-hop and reggae".

The sounds and artistry direction of album was adapted and developed through four years that followed until the finished product, even putting songs written by her a long time ago. "The creation of the album has been going on for a while and I certainly had no idea what was getting myself into when I started it. [...] The songs on the album 'Wake Up' and 'Underworld' I wrote ages ago, with no real plan of them going on a record. Then I met Damien Marley when we were working on the Superheavy stuff and we started writing songs in the spare time we had between the sessions. I developed such a strong love for reggae music."

In 2014, Stone also worked with the Urban Folk Quartet members Joe Broughton and Paloma Trigas, who provided string parts for the album. Band member Tom Chapman said how the collaboration began: "Joss watched our gig at Green Man festival last year and came up to chat afterwards. She's really lovely and since then she's stayed in touch and come to see us on tour. When she needed something a little different for the strings on her new record she invited Joe and Paloma down to her studio where they had a great time making music".

Release and promotion
Stone signed deals with three different label services for the album release. The album was released via Stone's own label, Stone'd Records, in conjunction with Essential Music & Marketing in the United Kingdom and Ireland. Kobalt handled distribution in the United States, Canada, Australia, South America, Japan and China, while Membran was in charge for Europe and Africa. Essential's Stuart Meikle said: "Essential are absolutely delighted to be a part of the ongoing development of Joss's musical adventure."

In addition to the album's release, Stone embarked on a proper "world tour" with the intention of playing a gig in every country on the planet. The Total World Tour began on 29 March 2014 in Casablanca, Morocco and concluded on 3 July 2019 in Barcelona, Spain.

Critical reception

Water for Your Soul received generally positive reviews from music critics. At Metacritic, which assigns a normalised rating out of 100 to reviews from mainstream publications, the album received an average score of 62, based on 14 reviews.

At The Guardian, Caroline Sullivan wrote: "the pro-weed track 'Sensimilla' will prompt mass eye-rolling because of her decision to sing part of it in patois, and Harry's Symphony likewise (her accent – 'If you want to get 'igh, bring your own supply' etc. – turns it into Stone's own 'Dreadlock Holiday', which probably wasn't the intention)." Concluding her review on a more positive note, Sullivan suggested: "this album is definitely worth an unbiased listen."

Shaun Connors of Trucking magazine wrote: "Hideous. Stone's previous soulful wailings were bad enough, but this tangential slide into pop-reggae is even worse. Bland and with no sense of genuine style or direction." Concluding a one star out of five review, Connors added: "This 'I'll do what I want release' is suited to no more than beach-bar background music on a Death In Paradise-style Caribbean island."

Commercial performance
Water for Your Soul debuted at number 13 on the UK Albums Chart, selling 4,615 copies in its first week. As of December 2015, the album had sold 29,000 copies in United States, becoming the best-selling current reggae album of 2015 and, so far, the second largest overall.

Track listing

Personnel
Credits adapted from the liner notes of Water for Your Soul.

Musicians

 Joss Stone – vocals ; backing vocals 
 Richie Stevens – drums 
 Pete Iannacone – bass 
 'Level' Neville Malcolm – bass ; guitar ; electric guitar 
 Jeff Scantlebury – congas ; percussion ; drums 
 Stanley Andrews – guitar 
 Leon Mobley – percussion 
 Jonathan Shorten – piano ; keyboards ; Wurlitzer ; organ ; Rhodes ; Hammond ; melodica ; clavinet 
 Jeff T. Watkins – saxophone ; horn arrangements
 Ian Smith – trumpet, trombone 
 Artia Lockett – backing vocals 
 Ellison Kendrick – backing vocals 
 Antonia Jenae' – backing vocals 
 Ricardo Jordan – drums 
 Alan Weekes – guitar ; electric guitar 
 Wil Malone – string arrangement 
 Tony Stanton – copyist 
 London Session Orchestra – strings 
 Damon Bryson – tuba 
 Lakehouse Music Academy – children's choir 
 Nitin Sawhney – nylon guitar 
 Orphy Robinson – vibraphone 
 Dennis Bovell – bass ; backing vocals 
 Janet Ramus – backing vocals 
 Michelle John – backing vocals 
 Damian Marley – additional vocals 
 Steve Down – guitar ; acoustic guitar 
 Ashwin Srinivasan – bansuri flute 
 Aref Durvesh – tabla ; dholak 
 Marc Cyril – bass 
 Linton Kwesi Johnson – vocal sample 
 Jonathan Joseph – drums 
 Ponciano Almeida – berimbau 
 Joe Broughton – violin 
 Paloma Trigas – violin 
 Sarah Harrison – violin 
 Judacamp Choir – gospel choir 
 Jules "Juda" Bartholomew – choir direction, choir arrangement

Technical
 Joss Stone – production
 Jonathan Shorten – production, engineering
 Steve Greenwell – production, engineering, mixing
 Brian Nelson – executive production
 Tommy Williams – additional engineering
 Jay Auburn – additional engineering
 Chris Athens – mastering
 Eddie Ward – additional engineering
 Robert Hall – engineering assistance
 Erik Romero – engineering, engineering assistance
 Tim Tannella – engineering assistance
 Andre "A-minor" Johnson – choir engineering
 Jon Bailey – string engineering
 John Prestage – engineering assistance

Artwork
 Aoife Hastings – art design
 Rod Cousins – additional art design, layout

Charts

Weekly charts

Year-end charts

Notes

References

2015 albums
Hip hop albums by English artists
Joss Stone albums
Reggae albums by English artists
Stone'd Records albums
World music albums by English artists